The Lynch Historic District, in Lynch, Kentucky, is a  historic district which was listed on the National Register of Historic Places in 2003.  It included 298 contributing buildings, four contributing structures, and a contributing site.

The district is roughly bounded by city limits, L&N railroad bed, Big Looney Cr., Second, Mountain, Highland Terrace, Liberty, and Church Streets.

Lynch was the largest company-owned coal mining town in Kentucky and was established by U.S. Coal and Coke Company, a subsidiary of U.S. Steel.

References

Historic districts on the National Register of Historic Places in Kentucky
Colonial Revival architecture in Kentucky
National Register of Historic Places in Harlan County, Kentucky
Company towns in Kentucky
Coal towns in Kentucky
U.S. Steel